Allen Hubbard  (a.k.a. Al West) (December 9, 1860 – December 14, 1930), was a Major League Baseball player who played catcher and shortstop in two games for the 1883 Philadelphia Athletics of the American Association.

External links

1860 births
1930 deaths
Major League Baseball shortstops
Major League Baseball catchers
Philadelphia Athletics (AA) players
19th-century baseball players
Springfield (minor league baseball) players
Meriden (minor league baseball) players
Baseball players from Massachusetts

 Al Hubbard at SABR (Baseball BioProject)